Yeo Reum (born 22 June 1989) is a South Korean footballer who plays as midfielder for Incheon United of K League 1.

Club career
He was selected by Gwangju FC in the 2012 K-League draft, but didn't see the field in his first drafted year. He made his debut in the league match against Sangju Sangmu on 16 March 2013.

References

External links 

1989 births
Living people
Association football midfielders
South Korean footballers
Gwangju FC players
Jeju United FC players
FC Seoul players
Incheon United FC players
Gimcheon Sangmu FC players
K League 1 players
K League 2 players